Joseph Stanley Snowden (16 October 1901 – 22 January 1980), was a British Liberal Party politician and barrister.

Background
He was the eldest son of Joseph Snowden and Fanny Ruth Snowden of Morecambe and Heysham, Lancashire. He was educated at Sedbergh School and St John's College, Cambridge. Law Tripos (Cantab) 1923 (BA, LLB). He married, in 1938, Agnes Enid Mitchell. They had no children.

Professional career
He was Called to the Bar, Inner Temple, 1925. He joined the North-Eastern Circuit in 1925. He was Deputy Chairman, West Riding of Yorkshire Quarterly Sessions from 1960–71. He was Recorder of Scarborough from 1951–71. He was a Recorder and honorary Recorder of Scarborough from 1972–73. He was Chairman of the Yorkshire and Lancashire Agricultural Land Tribunal from 1963–71.

Political career
He was active in Bradford and  Yorkshire Liberal federations.
He was Liberal candidate for the Bradford East Division of Yorkshire at the 1945 General Election. 

He was Liberal candidate for the Bradford East Division of Yorkshire at the 1950 General Election. 

He was Liberal candidate for the Dewsbury Division of Yorkshire at the 1951 General Election. 

He was Liberal candidate for the Dewsbury Division of Yorkshire at the 1955 General Election. 

He was Liberal candidate for the Pudsey Division of Yorkshire at the 1959 General Election.

References

1901 births
1980 deaths
Liberal Party (UK) parliamentary candidates
Alumni of St John's College, Cambridge